The Zwartbosch Private Nature Reserve is a nature reserve in private hands in the Western Cape Province of South Africa.

References

Nature reserves in South Africa
Protected areas of the Western Cape